Frederick Clark Inman (June 7, 1881 - December 16, 1929) was an American tennis player active in the early 20th century.

Tennis career
Inman reached the quarterfinals of the U.S. National Championships in 1909.

Grand Slam tournament performance timeline

External links 

American male tennis players
1929 deaths
1881 births